Andrew W. Stafford (1810 in Saratoga County, New York – ?), was a member of the Wisconsin State Assembly. He resided for several years in Ontario County, New York prior to becoming a farmer in Geneva, Wisconsin.

Stafford was married to Ann Sobrina Ellis. They had four children.

Political career
Stafford was a member of the Assembly during the 1872 session. In addition, he was on several occasions a member of the town board (similar to city council) of Geneva. He was a Republican.

References

People from Saratoga County, New York
People from Ontario County, New York
People from Geneva, Wisconsin
Republican Party members of the Wisconsin State Assembly
Wisconsin city council members
Farmers from Wisconsin
1810 births
Year of death missing